Vanessa Krüger (born 17 March 1991) is a German actress, known for her roles in films such as French for Beginners, 42plus, and The Prize.

Early life and career

Krüger was born and grew up in Berlin. At the age of 13, she pursued her career by attending drama school. She also attended the Deutsche Film- und Fernsehakademie Berlin (DFFB), an acting agency in Berlin. After this she played as Lena in Christian Ditter's French for Beginners. The film which she was involved was ranked number four of the German cinema charts.

Filmography

Film

Television

References

External links

1991 births
Living people
Actresses from Berlin
German film actresses
German television actresses
21st-century German actresses